The Ziade Palace ( [Ziade Palace])  is a 19th-century grand mansion located in Beirut's Zokak el-Blat quarter.

History
The mansion was commissioned in 1860 by an unknown individual and built by an Italian architect known solely as Altina. It was purchased ten years later by Youssef Nasr, a wealthy Lebanese expatriate in England.

In 1930 the mansion was bought by the Ziade brothers; Joseph a physician and Louis an accomplished lawyer and president of the Aleppo bar association. The Ziades were related to the-then Maronite archbishop of Beirut Ignatius Ziade and to the renowned feminist poet, writer and essayist May Ziade

In addition to its singular architecture, the mansion gained notoriety following an incident involving Joseph and May Ziade. May suffered severe depression and neurasthenia for years after the loss of both her parents and above all Khalil Gibran. She also had an unhappy love affair with the writer Abbas el-Akkad in 1936 which worsened her condition. In 1938, Joseph Ziade visited May in Egypt and convinced the disconsolate poet to return to Beirut and to reside in the family mansion close to friends and family.

May returned to Beirut in 1939; days after her arrival to the Ziade palace, May was committed to the 'Asfourieh asylum in Hazmiyeh against her own will. Joseph tried to gain control on her estate because she was thought to be unable of managing her own properties. May eventually recovered her lucidity and returned to Cairo where she died on October 17, 1941.

The house was occupied by the Ziades until the beginning of the Lebanese civil war in 1975. The mansion was pillaged and occupied by militias during the conflict and it was left with a bullet-peppered facade and a poor condition. 
The structure was classified as a historic monument by the Lebanese Directorate General of Antiquities and is awaiting funds for appropriation or restoration.
Today, the Ziade Palace belongs to many partners (sharing) like the Wazzan family, Issa Family etc…The Issa Family possess a share in Ziade Palace because Raji Issa a businessman gave a loan to Joseph Ziade and unfortunately he  could not return the amount of money and Raji took a share from Ziade Palace.When Raji Issa died the share had gone to his siblings Bahjat Issa and Fouad Issa and when Fouad Issa died he gave the share to his only brother because he do not have kids. When Bahjat Issa died the share had gone to his living kids at the time: Hind Issa Zananiri, Leila and Fadia.

Location and historical geography 
Löytved's map of Beirut shows the mansion which predates the 1876 document. The mansion was located at the western outskirts of the nascent Zokak-el-Blat district. Before the development of the neighborhood, the mansion's west and south facing arched galleries opened up on the dunes of Ramlat az-Zarif, which extended all the way to the Ras Beirut peninsula. To the North, the mansion's main facade opened towards the garden-clad Qantari neighborhood and to the Minet el-Hosn bay. The road skirting the western walled garden of the mansion was named after Beirut's sand hills, Tariq ar-Raml (meaning the sand road, later renamed Abdel-Kader street) follows the course of the flat valley rising from north to south. To the opposite of Tariq ar-Raml stood mulberry and citrus orchards interdispersed  by small irregular buildings. The Zokak el-Blat gardens persisted from the start of the suburban expansion of Beirut until the early 20th century.

Today, Qasr Ziade stands on the western edge of Beirut's Zokak el-Blat quarter, on the southeast intersection of Rue Abdel-Kader and Hussein Beyhum streets; the mansion's western facade faces the Selim Bustani street. Today, the neighborhood of Zokak el-Blat is composed of heterogeneous buildings with contrasting architectural types and different epochs that characterize Beirut's urbanized peripheral quarters. The Ziade Palace and its surrounding grand mansions are overshadowed by cement towers and are in a decrepit state.

Architecture

The sandstone mansion comprises three stories_ a ground floor and two residential levels. The ground floor is a large vaulted space used for the storage of goods. The residential part of the mansion take the form of a typical Lebanese central hall house with a facade lined with the iconic three arches and numerous Oeil-de-boeufs that are typical to 19th century Lebanese aristocratic houses. The mansion is also characterized by a riwaq on its eastern facade, it is a decorated covered area in a gallery, with broken arches opening onto a garden. The roof is made up of red tiles and is decorated with twin towers on the structure's northern facade. In 2010, the Ziade mansion along with other 19th century palaces were further protected by a ministerial decree by then culture minister Salim Wardeh.

References

Bibliography

Further reading
 هكذا أُنقذ قصرا حنينة وزيادة في بيروت 

Palaces in Lebanon
Buildings and structures in Beirut
Houses completed in 1860